Gegeneophis primus is a species of caecilian discovered in Wynad district in the Western Ghats of Kerala, India. The species was described in 2012 by Ramachandran Kotharambath, Mark Wilkinson, and colleagues.

References

primus
Amphibians described in 2012
Amphibians of India